On 4 April 1975, a Lockheed C-5A Galaxy participating in the first mission of Operation Babylift crashed on approach during an emergency landing at Tan Son Nhut Air Base, South Vietnam. The cause was ascribed to loss of flight control due to explosive decompression and structural failure. The accident marked the second operational loss and first fatal crash for the C-5 Galaxy fleet, and is the third deadliest accident involving a U.S. military aircraft after the 1968 Kham Duc C-130 shootdown and Arrow Air Flight 1285.

Background 
In early April 1975, with much of South Vietnam overrun by communist North Vietnamese forces, the administration of U.S. President Gerald Ford began instituting the evacuation of American citizens. To avoid alarming the host country, U.S. Ambassador to South Vietnam Graham Martin authorized Americans to be flown out under several conditions, one of which was Operation Babylift, in which American caregivers were paired with South Vietnamese orphans.

Description 
On the afternoon of Friday, 4 April 1975, C-5A, AF Ser. No. 68-0218, making the first flight of Operation Babylift, departed Tan Son Nhut Air Base for Clark Air Base in the Philippines. This first group of orphans would then transfer to charter flights and be welcomed by President Ford upon arriving in the United States in San Diego, California. At that moment the locks on the rear loading ramp failed, causing the cargo door to open explosively. This caused explosive decompression, temporarily filling the cabin with a whirlwind of fog and debris. The blowout severed control cables to the tail, causing two of four hydraulic systems to fail, including those for the rudder and elevator, and leaving the flight control with only the use of one aileron, spoilers, and power.

The pilot, Captain Dennis "Bud" Traynor; copilot, Captain Tilford Harp; and flight engineer, Master Sergeant Allen Engles, attempted to regain control of the airplane, and to perform a 180-degree turn in order to return to Tan Son Nhut. While turning on final approach, the plane's descent rate suddenly began to increase rapidly. The crew increased power to the engines in an attempt to arrest the descent, but despite their efforts, the plane touched down at 4:45 p.m. in a rice paddy, and skidded for a quarter of a mile (400 m), became airborne again for another half-mile (800 m), crossing the Saigon River, then hit a dike and broke up into four pieces. The fuel caught fire and some of the wreckage was set ablaze.

Survivors struggled to extricate themselves from the wreckage. The crash site was in a muddy rice paddy near the Saigon River, one mile (1.6 km) from the nearest road. Most of the survivors were in the upper deck, while most of the people in the lower deck were killed. Fire engines could not reach the site, and helicopters had to set down some distance from the wreckage. About 100 South Vietnamese soldiers deployed around the site, which was near the site of an engagement with the Viet Cong the previous night. Out of 314 people on board, the death toll included 78 children, 35 Defense Attaché Office employees and 11 U.S. Air Force personnel; there were 176 survivors. All of the surviving orphans were eventually flown to the United States. The dead orphans were cremated and were interred at the cemetery of the St. Nikolaus Catholic Church in Pattaya, Thailand. The accident would also "stand as the single largest loss of life" in the Defense Intelligence Agency's history until the September 11 attacks because among the crash fatalities were five DIA employees.

Aftermath 
Some members of the United States Congress called for a grounding of C-5s. In the end, the fleet was put under severe operational restrictions for several months while the cause was established. The U.S. Air Force Accident Investigation Board attributed the survival of any on board to Captain Traynors unorthodox use of power and his decision to crash land while the aircraft still allowed him some control. Captains Traynor and Harp, who both survived, were awarded the Air Force Cross for extraordinary valor. Thirty-seven medals were awarded to crew members or their next of kin. USAF Flight Nurse, 1st Lieutenant Regina Aune, received the Cheney Award for 1975.

Investigation

Given the explosive manner in which the rear doors failed, sabotage was initially suspected.

Many of the components were looted from the crash site, thereby complicating the investigation; the U.S. Air Force paid a bounty for parts from the wreckage to recover them from the local populace. The United States Navy rescue salvage ,  fleet tug  amphibious cargo ship , frigate , and command ship  were assigned to search for the flight data recorder in the South China Sea. The rear hatch and flight recorder were found by the USS Abnaki and USS Deliver and helicopters also discovered wreckage from the doors in the South China Sea as well as the body of a C5 crewmember.

When the rear doors were eventually recovered from the sea, investigation determined that some of the locks had not engaged properly. Maintenance records showed that locks had been cannibalized for spares, then subsequently improperly refitted so that not all the door locks were engaging correctly. Accounts also indicated the initial maintenance inspection noticed five of the seven locks were not operating and failed the aircraft for flight.  With external organizational pressure to get the flight airborne, a second off-shift maintenance team was called in.  They subsequently missed the locks during inspection and the aircraft was cleared for flight. Furthermore, the flight crew confirmed that they had encountered difficulty closing the doors before take-off. As the air pressure differential increased with altitude, the few locks that were working correctly were unable to bear the load, and the door failed.

Dramatization
The story of the disaster was featured on the seventh season of the Canadian-made, internationally-distributed documentary series Mayday, in the episode "Operation Babylift".

See also

Turkish Airlines Flight 981
Japan Airlines Flight 123
United Airlines Flight 232
United Airlines Flight 811
American Airlines Flight 96
China Airlines Flight 611

Notes

References

External links
 C-5A Galaxy Babylift Crash – Facebook group operated by Dennis Traynor, aircraft commander during the 1975 incident.
 First-Person Account – Pilot Dennis "Bud" Traynor Page 6
 World Airways – Homeward Bound – 30 Years After Page 44 (pdf page 34)

Aviation accidents and incidents in Vietnam
Accidents and incidents involving United States Air Force aircraft
Accidents and incidents involving the Lockheed C-5 Galaxy
Aviation accidents and incidents in 1975
1975 in Vietnam
Decompression accidents and incidents
History of South Vietnam
April 1975 events in Asia